Breakwater Cat is the tenth album by American singer Thelma Houston, released in 1980 on RCA Records. The 12" single "Suspicious  Minds" became a popular club hit. Breakwater Cat contains five songs written by Jimmy Webb, who was also the executive producer of the album.

Track listing
All songs were written by Jimmy Webb; except where indicated.
 "Breakwater Cat" – 3:55
 "Long and Lasting Love" – 5:30
 "Before There Could Be Me" – 3:12
 "Gone" – 3:43
 "What Was That Song" – 4:19
 "Suspicious Minds" (Mark James) – 4:15
 "Down the Backstairs of My Life" (Eric Mercury, William Smith) – 3:00
 "Understand Your Man" (Alan Gordon) – 3:27
 "Lost and Found" (Daniel Moore) – 4:20
 "Something We May Never Know" (Shelby Flint) – 3:38

Personnel
Music
 Thelma Houston – vocals
 Sonny Burke – piano, arrangements
 Matthew McCauley – string and horn arrangements 
 David T. Walker, Tim May, Steve Beckmeier, Carlos Rios, Steve Hunter, Fred Tackett, Greg Poree – guitar
 David Shields, Eddie N. Watkins Jr., Keni Burke, Scott Edwards, Dennis Belfield, Reggie McBride – bass guitar
Gary Morse - steel guitar on "Something We May Never Know"
Jerry Peters - keyboards
 James Gadson – drums
Jerry Hey - horn
 Paulinho da Costa – percussion 
 Clydie King – backing vocals
 Greg Wright – backing vocals
 Oren Waters – backing vocals
 Tom Kelly – backing vocals

Production
 James Gadson – producer
 Michael Stewart – producer
 Mike Vickers – assistant producer
 Jimmy Webb – executive producer
 Brian Christian – engineer
 Frank "Cheech" D'Amici – engineer
 Mark Linett – engineer
 Rick Hart – engineer
 Rick Ruggieri – engineer
 Gribbitt! – art direction
 Henry Vizcarra – art direction
 Tim Bryant – art direction
 Charles Veal, Jr. – contractor
 Jerry Hoff – contractor
 Sid Sharp – contractor
 Lynne Morse – A&R coordinator
 Linda Gerrity – production coordinator
 Glenn Parsons - design
 Gribbitt! - design
 John Arrias – mixing 
 Ron Slenzak – photography

References

1980 albums
Thelma Houston albums
RCA Records albums